Daniel Ling,  (March 16, 1926 – August 9, 2003) was a foremost authority on the teaching of speech to deaf children. His speech teaching methods are widely used throughout the world.

From 1973 to 1984, he was a Professor, Graduate Studies in Aural Habilitation at McGill University. During the early 1980's Daniel Ling also took up the building of violins.  From 1984 to 1991, he was Dean of the Faculty of Applied Health Sciences at the University of Western Ontario.

In 1999, he was made an Officer of the Order of Canada. He was granted Canadian armorial bearings in 2001.

Today, cochlear implants are allowing deaf children to develop spoken language at a level unseen at any time before. As part of a daily monitoring regimen, the Ling Six is used to assure proper implant performance. The Ling Six consists of the sounds "oo", "ee", "ah", "m", "s", and "sh". If the child can hear each one accurately, as evidenced by echoing each sound delivered behind his/her back, the implant is considered working properly.

References

Nicholls, G. (1979), ‘Cued Speech and the Reception of Spoken Language.’ Master's Thesis, McGill University, Montreal, (available from Gallaudet University). Summary, co-authored by Dr. Daniel Ling, published in the Journal of Speech and Hearing Research, 25, 262–269, Nicholls, G. and Ling, D. (1982) http://www.cuedspeech.org.uk/index.php?page=110

External links
 Biography

Thesis, 1979 http://www.cuedspeech.org.uk/index.php?page=110 

1926 births
2003 deaths
Canadian university and college faculty deans
Officers of the Order of Canada
Academic staff of McGill University